Ghandi Kassenu (born 9 August 1989) is a Ghanaian footballer who plays as a defender. He currently plays for Al-Merrikh in Sudan Premier League.

Career 
Kassenu began his career with Liberty Professionals and was loaned out to Swedish club BK Häcken in 2008. In 2011, Dassenu joined Moldovan club Sheriff Tiraspol for their 2011–12 Divizia Naţională season.

International career 
Kassenu was a member of the Ghana U20 team that won the FIFA U-20 World Cup in Egypt 2009. Kassenu came on as a substitute after 65 minutes in the final against Brazil on 16 October 2009.

Honours

Ghana
FIFA U-20 World Cup: 2009

References

External links
 
 Elite Prospects profile

1989 births
Living people
Ghanaian footballers
Ghana under-20 international footballers
Association football midfielders
Liberty Professionals F.C. players
BK Häcken players
FC Sheriff Tiraspol players
Degerfors IF players
Al-Merrikh SC players
Superettan players
Moldovan Super Liga players
Ghanaian expatriate footballers
Expatriate footballers in Sweden
Ghanaian expatriate sportspeople in Sweden
Expatriate footballers in Moldova
Ghanaian expatriate sportspeople in Moldova
Expatriate footballers in Sudan
Ghanaian expatriate sportspeople in Sudan